Nietzsche and Philosophy is a 1962 book about Friedrich Nietzsche by the philosopher Gilles Deleuze, in which the author treats Nietzsche as a systematically coherent philosopher, discussing concepts such as the will to power and the eternal return. Nietzsche and Philosophy is a celebrated and influential work. Its publication has been seen as a significant turning-point in French philosophy, which had previously given little consideration to Nietzsche as a serious philosopher.

Summary
Deleuze writes that the reception of Nietzsche's thought has involved two key issues, those of whether it helped to prepare the way for fascism, and whether it deserves to be considered philosophy. Deleuze, who compares Nietzsche to the philosopher Baruch Spinoza, considers Nietzsche as one of the greatest philosophers of the 19th century, crediting him with altering "both the theory and the practice of philosophy." Deleuze argues that Nietzsche's concepts, such as the will to power and the eternal return, have been generally misunderstood, the former as primarily concerning "wanting or seeking power", and the latter as "the return of a particular arrangement of things after all the other arrangements have been realised ... the return of the identical or the same". Deleuze notes that in Thus Spoke Zarathustra (1883), Nietzsche twice denies that "the eternal return is a circle which makes the same return." Deleuze also discusses the views of the philosophers Georg Wilhelm Friedrich Hegel and Martin Heidegger, and subjects such as dialectic.

Publication history
Nietzsche and Philosophy was first published by Presses Universitaires de France in 1962. The book was published in the English translation of Hugh Tomlinson by the Athlone Press in 1983.

Reception
Nietzsche and Philosophy received a mixed review from the philosopher Richard Rorty in The Times Literary Supplement. Rorty noted that the book received "considerable acclaim", and suggested that Deleuze's Anti-Oedipus (1972), written with the psychoanalyst Félix Guattari, represented a continuation of the work. He contrasted Deleuze's interpretation of Nietzsche with that of Heidegger. Though he credited Deleuze with making "illuminating" observations on subjects such as the relation between Nietzsche's views and those of Hegel, he criticized his discussion of the will to power and suggested that he attempted to bestow a superficial plausibility on untenable aspects of Nietzsche's views. He also believed that there was a significant contrast between Nietzsche's views and those of Deleuze.

Ronald Bogue observed that Nietzsche and Philosophy marked a significant turning-point in French philosophy, which had previously given little consideration to Nietzsche as a serious philosopher. He credited Deleuze with being one of the first commentators to discuss the concepts of the will to power and the eternal return carefully, and wrote that he raised questions that became central to Nietzsche studies and to French post-structuralism. He added that many of the central themes of Deleuze's later work were first stated in Nietzsche and Philosophy. The philosophers Bernd Magnus and Kathleen Higgins compared Deleuze's view of Nietzsche to that of philosophers such as Jacques Derrida, Alexander Nehamas, and Rorty. Nehamas argued that Nietzsche has a "double relation" to the philosophical tradition, undermining it while being aware that he cannot completely reject it, maintaining that Deleuze's view that Nietzsche originated a radical mode of "nondialectical" thought attributes an unequivocal view to Nietzsche he could not have held. Daniel W. Smith described Nietzsche and Philosophy as "one of the most important and influential, as well as idiosyncratic, readings of Nietzsche to have appeared in Europe". He compared the book to studies of Nietzsche by both the essayist Pierre Klossowski and Heidegger.

The philosopher Stephen Houlgate rejected Deleuze's view of Hegelian dialectic as the ultimate denial of life, writing that Deleuze was misled by Nietzsche. Michael Tanner described Nietzsche and Philosophy as a celebrated work. He considered it "quite wild about Nietzsche, but interesting about Deleuze." The philosopher Hans Sluga identified Nietzsche and Philosophy as a possible influence on the philosopher Michel Foucault. He suggested that the work helped Foucault to discover Nietzsche as a "genealogical thinker, the philosopher of the will to power." The philosopher Christopher Norris wrote that Deleuze approached Nietzsche in a way "sharply at odds with the received exegetical wisdom", and that Nietzsche and Philosophy was an "expository tour de force". The philosopher Peter Dews wrote that Nietzsche and Philosophy was central to the post-structuralist texts of the decade that followed its publication, including Anti-Oedipus. Che-ming Yang described the book as a masterpiece, maintaining that it shows that the reading of Nietzsche is central to Deleuze's philosophical project. The philosopher Alan D. Schrift wrote that it "was a major factor in the development of interest in Nietzsche in France in the 1960s."

See also
 Immanent evaluation

References

Bibliography
Books

 
 
 
 
 
 
 
 
 
 
 

Journals

 
  

1962 non-fiction books
Books about Friedrich Nietzsche
French non-fiction books
Presses Universitaires de France books
Works by Gilles Deleuze